Robert Irven Jones (March 28, 1912 – March 25, 1999) was an American football guard for the Green Bay Packers of the National Football League (NFL). He played college football for Indiana.

Biography
Jones was born on March 30, 1912 in Wabash, Indiana.

Career
Jones played with the Green Bay Packers during the 1934 NFL season. He played at the collegiate level at Indiana University.

See also
List of Green Bay Packers players

References

1912 births
1999 deaths
American football guards
Indiana Hoosiers football players
Green Bay Packers players
People from Wabash, Indiana